Grumpier Old Men is a 1995 American romantic comedy film, and a sequel to the film Grumpy Old Men. It stars Jack Lemmon, Walter Matthau, Ann-Margret, Sophia Loren, Burgess Meredith (in his final film role), Daryl Hannah, Kevin Pollak, Katie Sagona and Ann Morgan Guilbert. Grumpier Old Men was directed by Howard Deutch, with the screenplay written by Mark Steven Johnson and the original music score composed by Alan Silvestri. Meredith developed Alzheimer's disease and had to be coached through his role in the film. He died in 1997.

Plot 
The feud between Max and John has cooled and they have become good friends. Their children, Melanie and Jacob have become engaged. Meanwhile, John is enjoying his marriage to new wife Ariel. John and Max still call each other "moron" and "putz" respectively, but with friendly intentions.

The spring and summer fishing season is in full swing with the annual quest to catch "Catfish Hunter," an unusually large catfish that seems to enjoy eluding anyone that tries to catch it. However, the local bait shop closed after Chuck, the previous owner, died in the first movie. Maria Ragetti has purchased the property with the intent of converting it into a fancy Italian restaurant.

Irritated it will no longer be a bait shop, Max and John join forces to sabotage the restaurant. They are successful at first with their practical jokes. However, when Ariel learns what is going on, she tells John to apologize to Maria at once, and he does after Ariel kicks him out of the house. Max and Maria begin dating after discovering a shared passion for fishing, while her mother Francesca dates John's father, J.W.

To complicate things further, Jacob and Melanie call off their engagement due to stress from their parents' involvement. Upon hearing the news, John and Max reignite their feud and go back to their childish pranks again such as John cutting a hole in Max's fishing net and detaching the anchor to his boat. Max retaliates by disconnecting John's motor from his boat and broadcasting him nude (while Ariel was making a clay statue of him) at a Sears department store. Ariel is stressed out because of it and leaves John until things settle down. At the restaurant, Francesca is worried about all the time Maria spends with Max. She reminds her daughter of her five failed marriages and worries that Max will make it six.

After being convinced to take a long look at herself, Maria reluctantly stops seeing Max. Distraught over losing Ariel, John heads to the lake for his father's advice but finds that he has died in his favorite spot with a fishing pole in one hand and a can of beer in the other. Following the funeral and the spreading of J.W.'s ashes in the lake, John and Max call off their feud again.

After realizing that their own inability to properly plan a wedding is what drove their kids to call it off, they decide to set it right. They help Jacob and Melanie reconcile, explaining their drama. John decides to reconcile with Ariel and convinces Max to talk to Maria. He does and convinces her to take a chance on him, while convincing her mother that he's not going to be like her previous sons-in-law. John and Max manage to catch "Catfish Hunter" but they reluctantly decide to release it so it can be with J.W. in the lake. After they let it go, they realize that they're late for a wedding happening in town and rush to the church as quickly as they can. The wedding is revealed to be for Max and Maria, who have reconciled (Jacob and Melanie have eloped). On the way to their honeymoon, they discover Max's one-eyed bulldog, Lucky, in the car with them, being put there by John earlier as a prank. Ragetti's is also reformed so it will be both a restaurant and a bait shop.

Cast
 Jack Lemmon as John Gustafson Jr.
 Walter Matthau as Max Goldman
 Sophia Loren as Maria Sophia Coletta Ragetti Goldman
 Ann-Margret as Ariel Truax Gustafson
 Burgess Meredith as "Grandpa" John Gustafson Sr.
 Daryl Hannah as Melanie Gustafson Goldman
 Kevin Pollak as Jacob Goldman
 Katie Sagona as Allie (Melanie's daughter)
 Ann Morgan Guilbert as Francesca "Mama" Ragetti
 Max Wright as County Health Inspector

Reception

Box office 
Grumpier Old Men grossed $71 million at the North American box office, against a production budget of $25 million. Grumpier Old Men beat its predecessor's total of $70 million and cost $10 million less to make than the original. The film was released in the United Kingdom on March 1, 1996.

Critical response 
On review aggregator Rotten Tomatoes the film has an approval rating of 21% based on 19 reviews, with a rating average of 4.2/10. On  Metacritic, which assigns a weighted average rating to reviews, the film has a score of 46 out of 100, based on 14 critics, indicating "mixed or average reviews". Audiences polled by CinemaScore gave the film an average grade of "A−" on an A+ to F scale.

Roger Ebert gave the film a score of 2 out of 4 stars. Kevin Thomas of the Los Angeles Times described the film as contrived and getting by on the star power of the cast. Stephen Holden of The New York Times wrote: "Grumpier Old Men, which was directed by Howard Deutch from a screenplay by Mark Steven Johnson, who also wrote the first film, doesn't even try to make sense. And for all the vaunted grumpiness, nobody stays mad for long."

References

External links
 
 
 
 

1995 romantic comedy films
1995 films
American buddy comedy films
American romantic comedy films
American sequel films
Davis Entertainment films
1990s buddy comedy films
1990s English-language films
Films about old age
Films directed by Howard Deutch
Films produced by George Folsey Jr.
Films produced by John Davis
Films scored by Alan Silvestri
Films set in Minnesota
Films shot in Minnesota
Films with screenplays by Mark Steven Johnson
Warner Bros. films
1990s American films